S-boat may refer to:

 Schnellboot, German torpedo boat
 United States S-class submarine
 British S-class submarine (1914), a Royal Navy class of submarines that served during World War I
 British S-class submarine (1931), a Royal Navy class of submarines that served during World War II